Chan Yung-jan and Zheng Jie were the defending champions, but both chose not to participate. Dinara Safina and Galina Voskoboeva won in the final against Noppawan Lertcheewakarn and Jessica Moore, 7–5, 2–6, [10–5].

Seeds

Draw

Draw

References
 Main Draw

Malaysian Open - Doubles
2011 Doubles